Assumption of the Most Holy Virgin Mary Church is a catholic church in Bolderāja, a suburb of Riga, Latvia. The church is situated at the address 17 Goba Street.

References

External links 
 
 Bolderāja Assumption of the Most Holy Virgin Mary Parish  

Roman Catholic churches in Riga
Roman Catholic churches in Latvia